Aix-en-Diois (Vivaro-Alpine: Ais de Diés) is a former commune in the Drôme department in southeastern France. On 1 January 2016, it was merged into the new commune Solaure-en-Diois.

History
Aix-en-Diois belonged to the counts and later to the bishops of Die (twelfth century). Later, it belonged to the Princes of Orange, and finally to the La Tour du Pin family (seventeenth century). The commune contains the remains of Roman baths and the ruins of a 13th-century medieval castle with a polygonal enclosure and corner towers, rebuilt in the 16th century. The castle hall dates from the 17th century and is the former summer residence of the Bishop of Die. The main church is the Church of the Immaculate Conception.

Population

See also
Communes of the Drôme department

References

External links

Gazetteer Entry

Former communes of Drôme
Populated places disestablished in 2016
2016 disestablishments in France
Dauphiné